A diatribe is a kind of oration made in criticism of someone or something.

Diatribe or Diatribes may also refer to:

Books and publications
 "Diatribe" (newspaper column), a weekly newspaper column by Dean Kalimniou
Discourses of Epictetus or Diatribes, texts circulated by Arrian circa 108
 Diatribes, a work by Bion of Borysthenes
Diatribes, texts by Teles of Megara written circa 235 BC

Music
 Diatribe (band), an industrial rock group
 Diatribe (album), a 1996 album by Diatribe
 Diatribes (album), a 1996 album by Napalm Death